This is a list of episodes for the eleventh season (1960–61) of the television version of The Jack Benny Program. This was the first season where the show ran every week.

Episodes

References
 
 

1960 American television seasons
1961 American television seasons
Jack 11